José Francisco Jovel Cruz (born 26 May 1951 in Usulután, El Salvador) is a former professional football player from El Salvador, who represented his country at the 1982 FIFA World Cup in Spain.

Club career
Paco Jovel started playing football with the Calaveras football team in the Salvadoran Second Division when only 14 years old and joined hometown Primera División de Fútbol de El Salvador side Luis Ángel Firpo in 1972. He formed a formidable partnership with Brazilian Luis Nelson De Moraes but won his only league title during a couple of seasons with Águila, before finishing his career back at Luis Ángel Firpo after spending 15 years at the highest level. He was nicknamed el Káiser because his playing style resembling that of West Germany legend Franz Beckenbauer.

International career
Jovel made his senior debut for El Salvador in 1976 and played for his country in 22 FIFA World Cup qualification matches and all three matches at the 1982 World Cup Finals. In total, he played 110 matches for the Cuscatlecos in all (including unofficial) matches. Jovel also played for El Salvador at the 1975 Pan American Games.

Retirement and personal life
Jovel works as a social worker in San Miguel. He is married and has three children. His son Carlos Francisco Jovel Navas played for Luis Ángel Firpo.

Honours
Primera División de Fútbol de El Salvador: 1
 1983

References

External links
Palabra de “el Kaiser” - El Gráfico 

1951 births
Living people
People from Usulután Department
Association football central defenders
Salvadoran footballers
El Salvador international footballers
1982 FIFA World Cup players
Pan American Games competitors for El Salvador
Footballers at the 1975 Pan American Games
C.D. Águila footballers
C.D. Luis Ángel Firpo footballers